Comet C/2012 E2 (SWAN) was a Kreutz group sungrazing comet  discovered by Vladimir Bezugly in publicly available images taken by the SWAN instrument (Solar Wind ANisotropies) on board the SOHO spacecraft. It is recognized for being the first Kreutz sungrazer observed in SWAN imagery.

Discovery 
On March 8, 2012, Ukrainian amateur astronomer Vladimir Bezugly reported an unknown comet in 3 images taken by the SWAN instrument on board the SOHO spacecraft. Further study of this object revealed that it was a Kreutz group sungrazer with a perihelion date on March 15, 2012. This was particularly interesting because no Kreutz sungrazer had ever been bright enough to be observed by the SWAN cameras, not even Comet C/2011 W3 (Lovejoy) which was visible to the naked-eye three months earlier. This meant that Comet SWAN had a chance of being an exceptionally bright comet.

SECCHI and LASCO Observations 
The SECCHI HI1 camera on board the STEREO-B spacecraft was the first to observe the comet after the SWAN instrument. It entered the field of view on March 11 and appeared reasonably bright, though not as bright as it could have been.
The comet entered the visibility of SOHO's LASCO telescopes on March 13, there too the comet did not appear exceptionally bright, it was fainter in comparison to Comet C/2011 W3 (Lovejoy) at this stage of its orbit. Though it certainly appeared brighter than most sungrazing comets of the Kreutz group. It reached a maximum apparent brightness of mag +1 before it declined in brightness due to disintegration. The comet did not survive perihelion.
SECCHI's COR instruments on both STEREO spacecraft also observed the comet's final moments.

Other observations 
The reason of the comet's brightness in SWAN remains unknown, though it is thought that the comet experienced an outburst a few days before discovery which rendered it much brighter than it was otherwise. 
No ground-based observations of the comet were available.

References 

Non-periodic comets
C2012E02
C2012E02
20120308